This is a list of professional snooker players ordered by the number of "ranking titles" they have won. A ranking title is a tournament that counts towards the snooker world rankings. World rankings were introduced in the 1976–77 season, initially based on the results from the previous three World Championships. This meant that the 1974 World Championship retrospectively became the first ranking event, won by Ray Reardon.

Until 1982, the World Championship was the only ranking event. In the 1982–83 season, two more ranking events were added to the snooker calendar: the International Open and the Professional Players Tournament. In 1984, the UK Championship, initially a non-ranking tournament, became a ranking event for the first time. More ranking tournaments were established over the years. In the 2018–19 season, there were twenty events worth ranking points.

List of winners

Following the 2023 Players Championship
Ronnie O'Sullivan holds the record for the most ranking titles, with 39. He surpassed Stephen Hendry's previous record of 36 by winning the 2020 World Snooker Championship. John Higgins is third on the list with 31 titles, followed by Steve Davis with 28. Davis held the record until Hendry's 29th ranking title win at the 1998 Thailand Masters.

Ranking title winners by country
Following the 2023 Players Championship

Minor-ranking tournaments

In 1992–93 and from the 2010–11 to the 2015–16 season there were a number of tournaments which contributed to the world rankings but at a lower rate than standard ranking tournaments. Wins in these tournaments are referred to as "minor-ranking titles". There were a total of 69 minor-ranking tournaments; 4 in the 1992–93 season with the remainder played from 2010 to 2016 as part of the Players Tour Championship.

Mark Selby had the most wins in minor-rankings events with 7. Mark Allen was second with 5 titles. A number of players won a minor ranking event but have never won a full ranking event: Tom Ford won two minor-ranking tournaments while Marcus Campbell, Tony Drago, Andrew Higginson,  Ju Reti, Rod Lawler, Rory McLeod, Barry Pinches, Troy Shaw, Joe Swail and Ben Woollaston each won once.

References

Sources

 

Ranking titles